Santana is a 2020 action film co-directed by Maradona Dias Dos Santos and Chris Roland. Co-written by Chris Roland and Maradona Dias Dos Santos, the film stars Paulo Americano, Terence Bridgett and Amanda Brown.

Cast 
 Paulo Americano as Dias
 Terence Bridgett
 Amanda Brown as Amanda Whiles
 Tamer Burjaq
 Nompilo Gwala
 Paul Hampshire
 Dale Jackson
 Hakeem Kae-Kazim as Obi
 Terri Lane
 Robin Minifie as Rambo
 Raul Rosario as Matias
 Rapulana Seiphemo as Ferreira
 Jenna Upton
 Neide Vieira

References

External links
 
 

2020 films
2020 action films
Angolan action films
South African action films
English-language South African films
Films about brothers
Films about witchcraft
2020s English-language films